Microsorum punctatum is a fern from the subfamily Microsoroideae commonly called the fishtail fern. It has been used in traditional medicine.

Description

Like other members of subfamily Microsoroideae, this species is a facultative epiphyte; it often grows epiphytically, but can also grow atop the soil surface (terrestrially) in moist, well-drained areas. 

The rhizome is small, short, 50 mm in diameter, covered with dark brown scales; elongated scales, similar to triangles, 8 mm long. Single leaf lanceolate shape, green, 550 mm long, 50 mm wide, indistinct petiole, clear leaf bone, 3 mm diameter, pointed tip, winged base of leaf, branched leaf repetition.

Uses
Juice extracted from the fronds (leaves) of the fern is used as purgative, diuretic, and wound healing agents in traditional medicine in Assam.

References

Polypodiaceae
Flora of tropical Asia
Ferns of Asia
Medicinal plants